The Huff-Daland XB-1 was a prototype bomber aircraft built for the United States Army Air Corps.

The XB-1 was the first aircraft named using just a B- designation. Prior to 1926, the U.S. Army used LB- and HB- prefixes, signifying 'Light Bomber' and 'Heavy Bomber'. The first XB-1, called the Super-Cyclops by Huff-Daland, was an extension of the earlier Huff-Daland XHB-1 'Cyclops'. It was essentially the same in size, but sported a twin tail and twin engines.

Design and development
The XB-1's gunnery arrangement was new for an American bomber, but it had been previously used by the British and the Germans near the end of World War I. The Army Air Corps had decided that single-engined bombers such as the XHB-1 performed more poorly and with less safety than the more traditional twin-engined bomber.

Operational history
The aircraft flew for the first time in September 1927. Its original Packard engines did not provide enough power for the aircraft, and it was refitted with more powerful Curtiss Aircraft "Conqueror" engines. This new configuration was designated the XB-1B.

Three other similar aircraft designs were requested by the Army Air Corps around the same time which competed against the XB-1 for the contract. Of these three (the XB-2 Condor, the Sikorsky S-37 and the Fokker XLB-2), the Curtiss model eventually won, and only a single XB-1 was ever produced.

Specifications (XB-1B)

See also

References

External links

USAF Museum Article on XB-1
USAF Museum Article on XB-1B
Encyclopedia of American Aircraft

XB-01
Huff-Daland XB-01
Biplanes
Aircraft first flown in 1927
Twin piston-engined tractor aircraft
Conventional landing gear